Kent is a neighborhood in Northwest Washington, D.C. in the United States, bounded by Loughboro Road to the north, MacArthur Boulevard to the southwest, and Chain Bridge Road and Battery Kemble Park to the southeast. It is a suburban neighborhood, home to some of the most expensive homes in the city with an average home sales price in 2012 of $1.7 million ($ today).

Geography
Kent is a triangular-shaped neighborhood between Loughboro Road to the north, MacArthur Boulevard to the southwest, and Chain Bridge Road and Battery Kemble Park to the southeast.  The area was long considered part of Palisades, the community that lies to the south, opposite MacArthur Boulevard.  The neighborhood is bisected by Arizona Avenue which runs from southwest to northeast and divides it into two distinct areas.  The hilly western section was developed in the 1930s and 1940s in a suburban style of that time with similar-looking Colonial-style houses. The east developed more organically beginning before the Civil War and maintains a more rural character.  The neighborhood is entirely residential with all commercial development located along MacArthur Boulevard.

History

The earliest habitation after the organization of the District of Columbia in 1801 was along the road to the Chain Bridge across the Potomac River (now Chain Bridge Road) which lies at what is now the neighborhood’s eastern border.  The population grew during the Civil War, when settlements of freed and escaped slaves sprang up around Battery Kemble, one Civil War Defenses of Washington located to the east of the road.  After the war, blacks continued to settled in the area on land they were given or that they bought from other landowners.  Remnants of this community include a small cemetery established in 1868 and an old schoolhouse.

When the lots in this eastern section were finally subdivided, they assumed irregular shapes that reflected the land’s contours and previous land divisions.  Unlike many parts of Washington, this area did not have restrictive covenants barring habitation by black people or Jews.  Thus, the neighborhood became a haven for educated minorities, many of whom built houses designed by distinguished architects such as modernist Walter Gropius that were interspersed with 18th-century farmhouses and 19th-century bungalows.

Notable residents
Tucker Carlson

See also
The Palisades, Washington, D.C.
D.C. Neighborhoods Map

References

Neighborhoods in Northwest (Washington, D.C.)
1860s establishments in Washington, D.C.
The Palisades (Washington, D.C.)